Abdisho bar Berika or Ebedjesu (died 1318), also known as Mar Odisho or St. Odisho in English, was a Syriac writer. He was born in Nusaybin.

Abdisho was first bishop of Shiggar (Sinjar) and the province of Bet 'Arbaye (Arbayestan) around 1285 and from before 1291 metropolitan of Nisibis and Armenia. He was the author of the Marganitha (The Book of the Jewel), one of the most important ecclesiastical texts of the Assyrian Church of the East, a kind of theological encyclopaedia.

He wrote biblical commentaries in Syriac, as well as polemical treatises against heresy and dogmatic and legal writings. He also wrote texts in metrical form including an author catalogue, which an important role in Syrian literary history .

Works
 The "book of the jewel" or Marganitha (1298)
 Catalogue of biblical and ecclesiastical books.
 Paradise of Eden.

References

People from Sinjar
Year of birth unknown
1318 deaths
13th-century bishops of the Church of the East
Church of the East canonists
Syriac writers
Church of the East writers